Marianne Alopaeus (9 October 1918 – 10 November 2014) was a Finnish-born writer who published in Swedish.

Biography
Marianne Rosenbröijer was born in Ekenäs in southern Finland on 9 October 1918. She married in 1940 and her first novel was published in 1945 under her married name. The following year, she moved to Sweden. Mörkrets kärna ("The Dark Core") is her best known work and it deals with a woman who rejects the priorities of her children to concentrate on intellectual pursuits. The work is thought to be influenced by the style and approach of the existentialist Simone de Beauvoir. This book was nominated for the Nordic Council Literature Prize. In 1947, she was awarded the Finnish Thanks for the Book Award (Kiitos kirjasta -mitali in Finnish). Her books have been translated into Finnish and Norwegian.

She also lived in the United States and in France and moved to Sweden again in 1973. Ten years later, she wrote Drabbad av Sverige which deals with what it is to be Swedish. Only a week before her death, she was moved back to Finland, and she died in Helsinki in November 2014.

Works
 1945 – Uppbrott
 1950 – Dröm utan slut
 1953 – Utanför
 1959 – Avsked i Augusti
 1965 – Mörkrets kärna
 1971 – Betraktelser kring en gräns (a collection of essays)
 1983 – Drabbad av Sverige (a collection of essays)

References

1918 births
2014 deaths
Finnish writers in Swedish
Finnish women writers
Finnish expatriates in France
Finnish expatriates in Sweden
Finnish expatriates in the United States
Thanks for the Book Award winners